Sun Yun-suan (10 November 1913 – 15 February 2006) was a Chinese engineer and politician. As minister of economic affairs from 1969 to 1978 and Premier of the Republic of China from 1978 to 1984, he was credited for overseeing the transformation of Taiwan from being a mainly agricultural economy to an export powerhouse.

Early life and engineering career
Born in Penglai, Shandong, he earned his Bachelor of Electrical Engineering from the Harbin Institute of Technology in 1934. From 1937 to 1940 he was an engineer at the National Resources Commission and worked at a government-run power station in Qinghai province, he earned fame and respect throughout China for disassembling and then transporting an electrical/power boiler, into Kuomintang territory in order to prevent the expensive equipment from falling into enemy Japanese hands. During World War II (from 1939 to 1945), he was sent by the National Resources Commission to train in the United States as an engineer at the Tennessee Valley Authority.

In 1946, he was sent to Taiwan (which had just been handed over to the Nationalist Government from Japan following the Allied victory in World War II) to work at the Taiwan Power Company, a public utility. Managing a staff of several hundred, Sun was able to get 80% of the power network in Taiwan (destroyed during the war) restored in five months. At Taiwan Power Company, he was Head Engineer of the Electrical and Mechanical Department from 1946 to 1950, Chief Engineer from 1950 to 1962, and Vice President from 1953 to 1962.

Due to his successes in Taiwan, the World Bank sent him to Nigeria as head of the Electricity Corporation of Nigeria in 1964, which he served as CEO and General Manager until 1967. He increased Nigeria's power supply by 88%.

Government career
He returned to Taiwan and joined the ROC government as Minister of Communications in 1967. In 1969, he was transferred to become Minister of Economic Affairs and served until 30 May 1978 when he was promoted to Premier of the Republic of China.

He is credited as one of the chief architects of Taiwan's "economic miracle" that led Taiwan to become one of the East Asian Tigers. It was during Sun's premiership the Ten Infrastructure Projects, including the Chiang Kai-shek International Airport, the Number 1 Nuclear Power Plant, and the Sun Yat-sen National Expressway, were completed. Sun championed the establishment of high-technology industries that would later become the basis of the Taiwanese economy. He initiated the development of the Industrial Technology Research Institute (that would later give rise to numerous major semiconductor companies such as TSMC) and the Hsinchu Science-based Industrial Park which would serve as a major electronics and semiconductor manufacturing hub. Sun is also credited for transforming Taiwan's existing export industries, which were developed in the 1960s and centered on textiles, shoes, plastic toys, and agriculture, to the more sustainable fields of petrochemicals, machine tools, and electronics.

Later life

Sun was once regarded as heir apparent to Chiang Ching-kuo, but he suffered a stroke during a legislative interpellation session in 1984, ending his political career. Instead, Lee Teng-hui became Chiang's heir apparent and ultimate successor. Sun resigned as premier on 20 May 1984 and was appointed to the largely honorary position of senior advisor to the President of the Republic of China.

After his stroke, Sun became a major advocate of health issues such as the importance of monitoring high blood pressure for elderly people. He also campaigned against smoking.

Another stroke left him needing to use a wheelchair for mobility. Nevertheless, Sun remained politically active in his later years and campaigned on behalf of KMT presidential candidate Lien Chan in the 2004 presidential election.

He died at the age of 92 while hospitalized at the Veterans General Hospital in Taipei as a result of myocardial infarction and sepsis. Sun was accorded the honour of a State funeral due to his tremendous contributions and hard work and determination for Taiwan, which was held on February 25. Then-DPP President Chen Shui-bian also attended his funeral. Sun’s ashes were interred at the Keelung Hsin Hsin Cemetery.

References

Taipei Times: Leaders bid farewell to Sun
Taiwan News: Taiwan bids farewell to economy's mastermind 
The Irish Times: Architect of Taiwan's industrial revolution
China Post: Nation bids farewell to ex-Premier Sun

External links
Sun Yun-suan Foundation 孫運璿學術基金會

1913 births
2006 deaths
Deaths from sepsis
Infectious disease deaths in Taiwan
Harbin Institute of Technology alumni
Politicians from Yantai
Premiers of the Republic of China on Taiwan
Senior Advisors to President Chiang Ching-kuo
Senior Advisors to President Lee Teng-hui
Republic of China politicians from Shandong
Taiwanese Ministers of Economic Affairs
Taiwanese Ministers of Transportation and Communications
Taiwanese people from Shandong
People from Penglai, Shandong
Engineers from Shandong
Expatriates in Nigeria
Tennessee Valley Authority